The 1st Pan American Junior Athletics Championships were held in Sudbury, Ontario, on August 29–31, 1980.

Participation (unofficial)

Detailed result lists can be found on the "World Junior Athletics History"
website.  An unofficial count yields the number of about 217
athletes from about 17 countries:  Argentina (3), Bahamas (7), Barbados (2),
Bermuda (4), Brazil (15), Canada (58), Chile (4), Dominican Republic (12),
Guatemala (6), Guyana (2), Jamaica (7), Mexico (8), Panama (1), Suriname (2),
Trinidad and Tobago (6), United States (67), Venezuela (13).

Medal summary
Medal winners are published.
Complete results can be found on the "World Junior Athletics History"
website.

Men

Women

Medal table (unofficial)

References

External links
World Junior Athletics History

Pan American U20 Athletics Championships
1980 in Canadian sports
Pan American U20 Championships
Sports competitions in Greater Sudbury
International track and field competitions hosted by Canada
1980 in youth sport